Jardinella tumorosa is a species of minute freshwater snail with an operculum, an aquatic gastropod mollusc or micromollusc in the family Tateidae.  

This species is endemic to Queensland, Australia, where it occurs in the Mulgrave river system.

See also
 List of non-marine molluscs of Australia

References

Further reading

External links

Jardinella
Gastropods of Australia
Endemic fauna of Australia
Gastropods described in 1991